K-Love (stylized as K-LOVE) is a contemporary Christian music radio network owned by the Educational Media Foundation (EMF), a non-profit Christian ministry. 

As of June 2019, the network's programming is aired over 520 FM stations and translators in 48 U.S. states, American Samoa, Puerto Rico, and the District of Columbia. As of 2018, K-Love and its sister network Air1 reportedly had a weekly cumulative audience of about 20 million listeners.

History

1980s
In 1980, the Christian Life Center First Assembly of God of Santa Rosa, California, received a construction permit to operate a new noncommercial radio station in that city, KCLB on 91.9 MHz. The church, however, was being affected by a major scandal involving its trust fund, which had forced it into bankruptcy two years prior and had required the church to abandon its plans for the time being. Later in 1980, under new management, the church hoped to raise the funds to put the nearly fully equipped station on the air as a contemporary Christian music radio station.

In 1982, after several attempts to purchase a station in San Francisco, the Educational Media Foundation purchased KCLB for $65,760. Bob Anthony Fogel, a former DJ at KFRC, founded EMF, which in its early years was also known as Christian Media Ministries. Charles Colson assisted in fundraising efforts for KCLB in the San Francisco area. KCLB signed on October 15, 1982; the first song played on the station was "Praise the Lord" by the Imperials, which was a hit on the Christian music charts in 1979.

KCLB expanded in 1987 with new translators at San Rafael and Salinas.

On August 1, 1988, KCLB changed its call letters to KLVR and adopted its present K-LOVE moniker. A month and a half later, on September 12, its wooden transmitter building on Geyser Peak was burned to the ground by a brush fire believed to have been set by an arsonist. After the fire, the transmitter was relocated to  Mount Saint Helena. By 1989, KLVR had expanded further to include translators covering Santa Cruz, San Jose, and Los Gatos.

1990s
K-Love expanded its reach during the 1990s by purchasing small stations and translators, and repeating its signal. In 1992, K-LOVE began using satellite technology to expand to locations further away than just northern California. The Educational Media Foundation continued to purchase small translators in California but also bought stations in Portland, Oregon (KLVP), Phoenix, Arizona (KLVA), Oklahoma City (KYLV) and San Antonio (KZLV).

During the 1990s, K-Love also began to expand its on-air personalities. David Pierce joined in 1991 from KLTY in Dallas/Ft. Worth. Also Mike Novak,  JD Chandler and Larry Wayne started working air shifts in the late 1990s. In addition to expanding the on-air talent, K-LOVE expanded its facilities and moved its headquarters from Santa Rosa to Sacramento in 1993. In 1998 K-Love increased its reach online by streaming live on klove.com.

2000s
During the decade of the 2000s, K-Love went through a period of expansion through the purchase of stations and translators across the United States. On October 5, 2000, Colorado Christian University sold KWBI Morrison / Denver, KJOL Grand Junction and KDRH Glenwood Springs, Colorado as well as 18 translators to K-LOVE. The Colorado radio network was sold for a reported $16.6 million. A Colorado Christian University release said the board considered "many offers from Christian, as well as other suitors," but the priority was finding a buyer committed to "top-quality Christian programming."

In 2003, the EMF took advantage of a window of time where the Federal Communications Commission (FCC) allowed for the filing of new applications for FM translators, dubbed the "Great Translator Invasion". During that time, the FCC received over 13,000 applications for original construction permits on translators. The EMF filed over 800 applications, of which over 250 were approved, with most of those now carrying the K-Love network.

In January 2007, the EMF purchased 94.3 WJKL Elgin, Illinois, which broadcasts to the Chicago area, for $17 million. Shortly after the purchase, a flood hit the WJKL transmitter site that knocked the station off the air for more than a week. WJKL has since moved and now broadcasts from Oakbrook Terrace, Illinois to the Chicago market. On November 30, 2007, K-LOVE purchased 97.3 KCXM, which was an ESPN radio affiliate for Kansas City, for $16 million. The call letters were changed to KLRX shortly after and now broadcasts from Lee's Summit to the Kansas City area. As a result, these and other station purchases, plus the new translators approved during the 2003 filing window, the K-Love radio network grew to be the largest broadcaster of contemporary Christian music in the world. By 2010, K-Love had an estimated listenership of 6 million people.

In 2002, the EMF moved its headquarters from Sacramento, California, to Rocklin. The new headquarters now housed K-Love, Air1 and Christian Music Planet magazine. 

In 2001, Christian radio personality Jon Rivers, along with his wife Sherry, became the K-Love Morning Show hosts, and broadcast from their ranch in Texas. The show continued with Jon and Sherry for seven years until March 28, 2009, when it was announced that they would step down due to family issues. Host Lisa Williams assumed the duties of hosting the program, and was later joined by Eric Allen.  Other DJs also joined the team during this time such as Scott Smith  and Kelli Caldwell, which eventually became the afternoon show.  On October 1, 2008, Mike Novak was named president and CEO of the EMF, replacing Dick Jenkins, and as a result stopped having a regular on-air shift.

On July 15, 2009, the EMF bought 101.9 WKLU in Indianapolis, for $4.75 million, plus $1.55 million for the studio. The studio then became the broadcast location for the K-Love Morning Show.

2010–present

Into the new decade, the EMF began to purchase more full-power stations in medium and larger markets. Since 2010, K-Love had begun broadcasting, or upgraded signals in Dayton, Ohio (WKCD formerly WCDR), Jacksonville, Florida (WCRJ), Knoxville, Tennessee (WYLV, formerly WDLF),  Salt Lake City,  Utah (KKAT), Stockton, California, San Francisco, California (KLVS), San Diego, California, Camden, New Jersey and Detroit, Michigan on WDKL 102.7 FM.

The EMF acquired WKLV-FM in Port Chester, New York in 2010, and in May 2011 re-located its transmitter to the Trump Plaza in New Rochelle to cover New York City. In July 2012, the EMF swapped WLVM (formerly WABB Mobile, Alabama) with Cumulus Media, for Classic Hits WRQQ Nashville, Tennessee (a major hub for the Christian music community and where the majority of labels originate from). The EMF changed WRQQ's call sign to WLVU, which now broadcasts K-Love programming.

In July 2010, K-Love began sponsoring MacDonald Motorsports' #18 car and Michael McDowell in the NASCAR Nationwide Series. Then in March 2012, K-Love announced it would be the primary sponsor of Tony Pedregon's Funny Car for 12 of the final 20 races of the NHRA Full Throttle Drag Racing Series season. In February 2013, K-Love announced the inaugural K-LOVE Fan Awards, a listener-voted awards show for contemporary Christian musicians held in Nashville. The inaugural ceremony was held in June 2013, and hosted by Phil, Kay, Jasie, and Missy Robertson.

In July 2011, Amanda Carroll became the new mid-morning host and the network announced that Lisa Williams and Eric Allen would no longer be hosting the K-LOVE Morning Show. JD Chandler took their place until the K-LOVE Morning Show with Craig, Amy, and Kankelfritz acquired the spot in November 2011.

In December 2013, K-Love presented a Christmas music special for the cable network Up,  K-Love Music City Christmas. The special was hosted by Candace Cameron Bure, and featured performances of Christmas-themed music by various contemporary Christian musicians. 

In 2017, the EMF announced that it would acquire KSWD in Los Angeles, KSOQ-FM in San Diego County (licensed to Escondido), and WGGI in Scranton from CBS Radio and Entercom as part of their merger. The sale was approved on November 2, with KSWD flipping to K-Love as KKLQ; as Univision holds local trademark rights to the "K-Love" name in connection to its Spanish adult contemporary station KLVE (which has used the name since 1974), the station is marketed locally as "Positive, Encouraging 100.3" and "the K-Love for Christian music" to disambiguate it from KLVE. 

In March 2018, the EMF acquired Chicago's WLUP from Merlin Media, after Cumulus Media ended a local marketing agreement with the station due to their bankruptcy. The station was taken over by the EMF under an LMA at midnight on March 10, 2018, and flipped to K-Love; the moment was preceded by several songs referencing Satan, concluding with AC/DC's "Highway to Hell"—a subtle jab at the new ownership suggested by veteran Chicago broadcaster and former WLUP personality Steve Dahl.

In August 2018, after soft-launching it as an online radio station, K-Love launched K-Love Classics —a new classic hits network with a focus on contemporary Christian music from the 80s, 90s, and early 2000s. WAIW/Chicago flipped from Air1 to be one of the first over-the-air carriers of the network.  

In 2019, the EMF announced that it would acquire five stations from Cumulus Media, including most prominently New York's WPLJ.

In September 2022, the network marked the 40th anniversary of KCLB's launch.

Ministry
K-Love has a full-time ministry team that processes over 100 phone calls a day from listeners seeking guidance. According to the ministry, the pastors and staff at K-Love pray for over 1,000 prayer requests every day, and on average, intervene in one suicide case per day. Requests are submitted online or over the phone.

K-Love also partners with other ministries and donates air time and web site space to these ministries.

Awards and nominations

Christian Music Broadcasters Echo Awards

National Religious Broadcasters Awards

Best Christian Workplaces

Finances
K-Love is governed by the Educational Media Foundation, a 501(c)3 not-for-profit ministry. No individual owns any stock in the corporation, which is held for charitable purposes. Members of the board of directors at large serve without compensation for rotating four-year terms, and a person with supervisory accounting experience holds one of the board positions.

K-Love  stations are licensed as non-commercial educational stations; therefore, most of its funding is provided by donations. The majority of donations are made during seasonal pledge drives, usually held in the spring and in the fall.

In addition, EMF is a member of the Evangelical Council for Financial Accountability (ECFA). Founded by Billy Graham, the ECFA oversees EMF's financial affairs, ethics and reporting standards.

EMF is recognized by Charity Navigator with a Four-Star rating, the highest given to charities.  In addition, EMF is audited yearly by an independent accounting firm, ensuring accuracy and completeness of its books and records.

See also
Air1
K-Love Classics
List of radio stations in California

References

External links

 01
American radio networks
Contemporary Christian radio stations in the United States
LOVE
Companies based in Placer County, California
Radio stations established in 1982
1982 establishments in California